Bang Cheol-yong  (born March 10, 1991), better known by his stage name Mir, is a South Korean singer, rapper, dancer, and actor. He is a member of guy group MBLAQ. He enlisted in the army on 2016. He was discharged in July 2018.

Early life 
Mir was born in Bukha-myeon, Jangseong County , South Korea in the country side.

Career

MBLAQ (2009–2015)
Mir is the rapper and youngest member of the group MBLAQ. In 2011, Mir had injured himself, he had to go under a spinal disc surgery, but arrived to perform with the group after being inactive due to his injury. During the time with MBLAQ, Mir wrote the lyrics to "You're my +" and "Can't Come Back" alongside G.O around the year 2011.

In February 2012 Mir shared a picture on his Twitter of G.O working really hard on a new album (BLAQ%Ver.) for MBLAQ. On March 1, MBLAQ started their promotions for Run on M! Countdown. Also in 2012 Mir and G.O made a sub unit song where they both sang the song "Wild" for their Asia tour.

In 2013 Mir described their song Smoky Girl as an addictive song with sexy choreography. during the release of the album "Sexy Beat" during a photo shot for Cosmopolitan Korea.

Solo activities (2010–present) 
During the 2010 FIFA World Cup, MTV Korea created a program called Idol United, where members of male idol groups formed a soccer team to compete against other soccer teams. The fourteen-member team consisted of members from U-KISS, ZE:A, F.Cuz, and The Boss (Dae Guk Nam Ah), with MBLAQ members being Seungho, Lee Joon and Mir.

On February 21, 2010, Mir was featured on the song "Bad Person" by former member of Baby Vox Re.V, Ahn Jin Kyung. Where she performed the song on Inkigayo. On August 19, 2014, Mir has said that he is thinking of making a solo debut but nothing has been planned at the moment. During the same time of 2010 he collaborated with Kan Mi-youn on the song "Going Crazy" which also featured Lee Joon of MBLAQ. As of July 14, 2016 Mir has enlisted himself into the army to do his time. This came to a surprise to all fans out their who were trying to understand about him and the group's activity. He says "I'm sorry I couldn't tell you sooner. As the time comes for all the men in Korea to enlist, it also makes me think that isn't this that time for me too? I hope that you do not worry or be upset".

Acting career (2012–present) 
On November 11, 2012, Mir was in the reality TV show called The Romantic and Idol. He shared the screen time with Jun. K of 2PM, Park Hyung-sik of ZE:A, JB of JJ Project/Got7, and Seung Ah of Rainbow, Jei of Fiestar, Nam Ji-hyun of 4Minute, and Hyejeong of AOA. All were part of the first season. Around 2012 he was on the second season of Law of the Jungle and was known as the 3rd idol on the show. On August 11, 2015, Mir was on the kids musical program called "The Fairies in My Arms" alongside Spica's Yang Ji-won and GFriend Sinb, He plays a hero who saves weak children.

Personal life 
His sisters are Go Eun-ah and Bang Hyo-sun. His parents are Han Sung-sook and Bang Ki-soon.

Discography

Solo Artist

Featured Artist

OST's (Original Sound Track)

Songwriting credits

Filmography

Music Videos

Dramas

Television

Performance

References 

1991 births
J. Tune Entertainment artists
Living people
People from South Jeolla Province
People from Jangseong County
South Korean male singers
South Korean male idols
South Korean pop singers
South Korean hip hop record producers
MBLAQ members